The Black River Escarpment is a geological feature in Southeastern Ontario.
The escarpment marks the boundary of the older Canadian Shield bedrock and more recent Ordovician limestone.
The escarpment runs from Penetanguishene on Georgian Bay to Kingston on Lake Ontario.

See also
Niagara Escarpment
Onondaga Escarpment
Helderberg Escarpment

References

Geology of Ontario